Forward defence may refer to:

 Forward defence (cricket), a shot in cricket
 Forward defence (Roman military), a military tactic of the Roman Empire
 Muhamalai Forward Defence Line, a Sri Lankan defence line
 Forward defence, a Cold War NATO doctrine in Europe, see AirLand Battle